The Chesterton Tribune is a twice-weekly newspaper based in Chesterton, Indiana, United States. Serving Porter County, the Chesterton Tribune has about 4,409 subscriptions, and began in 1882.  The paper ceased publication of its print newspaper on December 30, 2020, before being revived a few months later by wealthy out-of-town owners and in a different format without news regarding any political information.

History 

The Chesterton Tribune was launched by W.W. Mikels in October 1882 as a Greenback Party weekly. Mikel lasted as the owner only for a few months until he sold the paper to the Chesterton Tribune Company. This company was a group of local businessmen and was headed by John Taylor. Taylor had to discontinue the publication of the paper in 1883. In 1884 the Tribune company sent representatives to Valparaiso, Indiana, to offer Arthur J. Bowserthe paper for $800. Bowser and lawyer S.D. Watson resumed publication of the Chesterton Tribune on April 2, 1884. The partners also decided to expand their paper to the town of Porter, Indiana. Watson decided to give up his share to Bowser in September 1884. The journal was published every Saturday and had seven columns of print. In April 1896 the Chesterton and Porter editions of the Tribune were combined to create the Westchester Tribune. Since the post office would not renew the postal permit with the new name, Bowser had to change the name back to the Chesterton Tribune in November 1897. In 1910, the price of a yearly subscription to the paper rose from $1.50 a year to $2.00 a year. 

Warren R. Canright and Phyllis Post, a couple living in Chesterton, Indiana, purchased the Chesterton Tribune. In 1961 the Chesterton Tribune changed from a weekly to a daily newspaper. In 1999 the Canrights published the Chesterton Tribune with their son, David Canright, as the editor and chief. In 2018 David Canright now owns the Tribune and the Chesterton Tribune Company is still the publisher. In 2018, David Canright was listed as the owner of the Tribune and the Chesterton Tribune Company. He is still the publisher. The Chesterton Tribune can be found at 193 S. Calumet, Chesterton. The company offers many different tools on their website, chestertontribune.com. Since 2018, the paper had 4,409 subscriptions and cost $36 a year. The paper ceased publication of its print newspaper on December 30, 2020, but was later revived in 2021 as a twice-weekly, full color paper after being bought by Hometown Media Inc. on March 10, 2021.

Achievements

In the 1920s the Chesterton Tribune was one of the only papers in Indiana to refuse any publication about the Ku Klux Klan. However, today the paper refuses to publish any information on ongoing civil-rights issues, deeming these topics "political" and not welcome in the paper.

During World War II Canright sent a free copy of the Tribune to all Chesterton and Porter soldiers. 

In 1970 the Chesterton Tribune switched to an offset printing process, the first paper in the country to do so.

In 1961 the change from a weekly to daily newspaper was so out of step with the times that the change was mentioned by Time magazine. 

The Chesterton Tribune was the oldest continuously published independent newspaper in Northwest Indiana. Northwest Indiana is the Calumet Region of Indiana that associates itself more with the city of Chicago than Indianapolis.

References

External links 

chestertontribune.com

Newspapers published in Indiana
Porter County, Indiana